is a Japanese surname. Notable people with the surname include:

Mari Yaguchi, a Japanese pop singer
Masaaki Yaguchi, guitarist for the Japanese rock band called Mucc
Shinobu Yaguchi, a Japanese film director and screenwriter
Yoko Yaguchi, a Japanese actress, and the wife of Japanese filmmaker Akira Kurosawa for 39 years
Yukihiko Yaguchi, a Japanese car designer
Yutaka Yaguchi, a martial artist

Japanese-language surnames